David Barral Torres (born 10 May 1983) is a Spanish professional footballer who plays as a striker for Internacional de Madrid.

He achieved La Liga totals of 221 games and 46 goals over eight seasons, with Sporting de Gijón, Levante and Granada. He added 136 matches and 30 goals in the Segunda División, and also played professionally in Turkey, the United Arab Emirates, Cyprus and Japan.

Club career
Born in San Fernando, Cádiz, Andalusia, Barral started playing professionally in the lower divisions, with Real Madrid's B and C teams, with a loan stint at neighbouring CF Fuenlabrada in between. In the 2006–07 season he moved to Sporting de Gijón where, in his second year, he formed a formidable attacking partnership with Mate Bilić (arrived in January 2008) to help the Asturias side return to La Liga after a 10-year absence.

Barral scored his first top-flight goal on 26 October 2008, from a penalty in a 3–0 away win against Deportivo de La Coruña. During the campaign he again paired up with Bilić for a total of 22 league goals, and scored a crucial one in the last matchday – a 2–1 home victory over Recreativo de Huelva – as Sporting avoided relegation.

On 20 March 2010, Barral scored at former club Real Madrid: he beat the offside trap and cut inside from the right hand, before firing past Iker Casillas for the game's first, but the hosts turned the score around for a final 3–1 win.

In 2010–11, Barral continued to battle with Bilić for first-choice status, with Sporting also having acquired Gastón Sangoy; coach Manuel Preciado often fielded only one striker. On 15 January 2011, in the 19th round, he opened his account, at home against Hércules CF (2–0). In the next league match, also at El Molinón, he also found the net, for the game's only goal against Atlético Madrid. The following month, he helped his team to a 1–1 home draw with FC Barcelona after a fine individual effort early in the first half.

In the 2011–12 season, Barral scored nine goals from 30 appearances (best in the squad), but it was not enough to prevent Sporting from being relegated after five years. On 5 July 2012, aged 29, he moved abroad for the first time, signing with Orduspor of the Turkish Süper Lig.

Barral returned to his homeland in the summer of 2013, penning a two-year deal with Levante UD. On 7 February 2015, he became the first national player to score a hat-trick in a year after Athletic Bilbao's Aritz Aduriz, in a 4–1 home win over Málaga CF.

On 5 July 2015, Barral signed for Al Dhafra FC in the United Arab Emirates after his contract with Levante expired. On 24 January of the following year, he returned to Spain and its top division after agreeing to an 18-month deal at Granada CF.

After being involved in a scuffle with teammate Isaac Cuenca during a meal at the club's sports city, in late November 2016, Barral was suspended indefinitely. On 16 January 2017, he signed an 18-month contract with Cypriot First Division champions APOEL FC. He scored twice on his debut six days later, in his team's 7–0 home defeat of AEZ Zakakiou for the domestic league.

On 27 May 2017, Barral's contract was mutually terminated, and he joined Cádiz CF on a one-year deal on 12 July. Still in that year, on 19 November, he scored in his very first match at Sporting's home ground after leaving, helping the visitors to a 3–0 victory.

On 15 January 2019, after a brief spell in the J2 League with Tokushima Vortis, the 35-year-old Barral returned to Spain and signed with Racing de Santander until 30 June. He achieved promotion to the second tier in his first season, scoring six goals.

Barral joined third-tier Internacional de Madrid on 19 January 2021, becoming the first player ever to be bought using cryptocurrency as Bitcoin was used to sign him instead of conventional currency.

International career
Barral was not capped by Spain at any level. He played for the Andalusia autonomous team on 7 June 2013 against their Madrid equivalent on the centenary of the latter's Football Federation, and scored both goals of a 2–1 win in Vallecas.

Career statistics

Club

Honours
APOEL
Cypriot First Division: 2016–17

References

External links

1983 births
Living people
People from San Fernando, Cádiz
Sportspeople from the Province of Cádiz
Spanish footballers
Footballers from Andalusia
Association football forwards
La Liga players
Segunda División players
Segunda División B players
Primera Federación players
Real Madrid C footballers
Real Madrid Castilla footballers
CF Fuenlabrada footballers
Sporting de Gijón players
Levante UD footballers
Granada CF footballers
Cádiz CF players
Racing de Santander players
Internacional de Madrid players
Süper Lig players
Orduspor footballers
UAE Pro League players
Al Dhafra FC players
Cypriot First Division players
APOEL FC players
J2 League players
Tokushima Vortis players
Spanish expatriate footballers
Expatriate footballers in Turkey
Expatriate footballers in the United Arab Emirates
Expatriate footballers in Cyprus
Expatriate footballers in Japan
Spanish expatriate sportspeople in Turkey
Spanish expatriate sportspeople in the United Arab Emirates
Spanish expatriate sportspeople in Cyprus
Spanish expatriate sportspeople in Japan